Dean Edward Smith (born October 21, 1928), known as Ed Smith, is a Canadian former politician the province of in British Columbia. He represented Peace River North in the Legislative Assembly of British Columbia from 1966 to 1979 as a Social Credit member.

He was born in Champion, Alberta in 1928, the son of Dean Allen Smith and Linna Florence Boyd, and was educated in Calgary and the University of Toronto, qualifying as a Chartered Life Underwriter. Smith was president of the Peace River Underwriters Club and served on the town council for Fort St. John. In 1973, he ran for the leadership of the Social Credit party. He was speaker for the British Columbia assembly from 1976 to 1978. Smith resigned his position of speaker when criticism followed the appointment of his former secretary Barbara Pennock to the auditor general's office. He married Miss Pennock in August 1978.

References 

1928 births
Living people
Speakers of the Legislative Assembly of British Columbia
British Columbia Social Credit Party MLAs